Geoglomeris is a genus of millipedes belonging to the family Glomeridae.

The species of this genus are found in Europe.

Species:

Geoglomeris duboscqui 
Geoglomeris etrusca 
Geoglomeris granulosa 
Geoglomeris jurassica 
Geoglomeris pertosae 
Geoglomeris pertosi 
Geoglomeris provincialis 
Geoglomeris subterranea

References

Glomerida